The Cerna is a river in Romania, a left tributary of the river Danube. The Cerna has its source on the south-east side of the Godeanu Mountains and flows into the Danube near the town Orșova. The upper reach of the river is sometimes called Cernișoara. There is a man-made lake on it (Tierna), just before it crosses the Băile Herculane spa, to perpetuate the old toponimic od Dierna. The upper course of the Cerna is part of the Domogled-Valea Cernei National Park. The Cerna flows through the villages and towns Cerna-Sat, Țațu, Băile Herculane, Pecinișca, Bârza, Topleț, Coramnic and Orșova.

Tributaries

The following rivers are tributaries of the river Cerna (from source to mouth):

Left: Arsaca, Jelerău, Valea Mare
Right: Șturu, Măneasa, Valea Cărbunelui, Valea lui Iovan, Balmez, Naiba, Olanul, Craiova, Iauna, Topenia, Iuta, Prisăcina, Belareca, Jardașița Mare, Sacherștița

References

Rivers of Romania
 
Rivers of Gorj County
Rivers of Caraș-Severin County
Rivers of Mehedinți County